Bourbon is a cultivar of Coffea arabica. It is one of the two main cultivars from which many new cultivars are bred, the other being Typica. Both originated in Yemen.

Bourbon coffee was first produced in Réunion, which was known as Île Bourbon before 1789. It was later taken by the French to mainland Africa and to Latin America.

Bourbon grows best at heights between 1,100 and 2,000 meters and gives a 20–30% higher yield than Typica, but produces a similar quality of coffee.  Bourbon has a commercially viable level of yield potential and growth habit but is generally susceptible to disease and pests.  Bourbon quality is generally accepted to be standard to good. The tree can grow tall and has a medium yield potential of very good quality cherries. It is susceptible to the major diseases of coffee.

Description 
Young leaves are green in color and mature leaves are generally larger than Typica leaves.  Plagiotropic (secondary) branches grow at a slight angle, roughly 60° from the main (orthotropic) stem.  Bourbon cherries are generally more round than Typica cherries.  Bourbon accessions from Yemen tend to have a single main stem (monocauly) whereas accessions from Ethiopia tend to form multiple stems.

See also 

 List of coffee varieties

Notes and references

External links
World Coffee Research Varieties Catalog: Bourbon

Coffee varieties
Flora of Réunion